SS Robert R. Livingston was a Liberty ship built in the United States during World War II. She was named after Robert R. Livingston, a Founding Father of the United States, a member of the Committee of Five that drafted the Declaration of Independence, the 1st United States Secretary of Foreign Affairs, the 1st Chancellor of New York, and a Minister to France.

Construction
Robert R. Livingston was laid down on 3 January 1944, under a Maritime Commission (MARCOM) contract, MC hull 1516, by J.A. Jones Construction, Brunswick, Georgia; she was sponsored by Mrs. Morton Funkhouser, daughter of James Addison Jones, and launched on 21 February 1944.

History
She was allocated to the A.H. Bull Company, on 29 February 1944. On 27 November 1946, she was laid up in the National Defense Reserve Fleet in Astoria, Oregon. On 5 August 1954, she was withdrawn from the fleet to be loaded with grain under the "Grain Program 1954", she returned loaded with grain on 18 August 1954. She was again withdrawn from the fleet on 20 December 1959, to have the grain unloaded, she returned empty on 24 December 1959. On 2 January 1962, she was sold, along with two other ships, to Zidell Exploration, Inc., for $193,707.91, for scrapping. She was delivered on 10 January 1962.

References

Bibliography

 
 
 
 
 

 

Liberty ships
Ships built in Brunswick, Georgia
1944 ships
Astoria Reserve Fleet
Astoria Reserve Fleet Grain Program
Ships named for Founding Fathers of the United States